Muslim Magomayev may refer to:

 Muslim Magomayev (composer) (1885–1937), Azerbaijani composer
 Muslim Magomayev (musician) (1942–2008), Azerbaijani opera and popular music singer